Joseph F. Fletcher, Jr., usually referred to as Joseph Fletcher (1934–1984), was an American historian of China and Central Asia and a professor in the East Asian Languages and Civilizations Department of Harvard University. His main areas of research included interaction between the Islamic and Chinese worlds, Manchu and Mongol studies.

Biography 
Fletcher graduated from Harvard University in 1957. He received his PhD from Harvard's Department of Far Eastern Languages in 1965, and became an assistant professor within the department a year later. In 1972, he was appointed professor of Chinese and Central Asian History.

Fletcher died on June 14, 1984, at the age of 49. He died from complications due to cancer.

Personal life 
Fletcher was the son of Joseph Fletcher, an ethicist. Fletcher had two children.

His son is Edward Fletcher, who played Sixth Officer James Paul Moody in Titanic (1997 film).

Notable works
Joseph Fletcher contributed several chapters  ("Ch'ing Inner Asia, c. 1800", and others) to vol. 10 of The Cambridge History of China:

Joseph Fletcher's posthumously published work, The Naqshbandiyya in Northwest China (Variorum, 1995), remains one of the main English-languages sources on the introduction of Sufism into China, and is extensively cited by practically all books in English on Islam in China published since then.

References

External links 
 The Joseph Fletcher Memorial Lecture: biography and bibliography.
 Joseph Fletcher Bibliography
 

American sinologists
American historians of Islam
Harvard University faculty
1934 births
1984 deaths
20th-century American historians
American male non-fiction writers
Mongolists
Harvard Graduate School of Arts and Sciences alumni
Historians of Central Asia
20th-century American male writers